The 2021–22 Louisiana Ragin' Cajuns men's basketball team represented the University of Louisiana at Lafayette during the 2021–22 NCAA Division I men's basketball season. The Ragin' Cajuns, led by twelfth-year head coach Bob Marlin, played their home games at the Cajundome as members of the Sun Belt Conference.

Previous season
The Ragin' Cajuns finished the 2020–21 season 17–9, 10–7 in Sun Belt play to finish second in the conference's Western Division. The Cajuns proceeded to the Sun Belt Conference Men's Basketball Tournament. After receiving a first-round bye, they ultimately lost to the Georgia State Panthers.

Offseason

Departures

Transfers

Recruiting

Roster

Schedule and results

|-
!colspan=9 style=| Exhibition

|-
!colspan=9 style=| Non-conference regular season

|-
!colspan=9 style=| Conference regular season

|-
!colspan=9 style=| Sun Belt tournament

See also
 2021–22 Louisiana Ragin' Cajuns women's basketball team

References 

Louisiana Ragin' Cajuns men's basketball seasons
Louisiana-Lafayette
Louisiana
Louisiana